Old Baron of Rautakylä is a Finnish silent horror film made in 1923, written and directed by Carl Fager and produced by Erkki Karu. The film is based on the novella Gamla baron på Rautakylä and the play Efter femtio år, both written by Zachris Topelius. The film premiered on April 1, 1923 at the Kino-Palatsi cinema in Helsinki, Finland.

Old Baron of Rautakylä is the very first Finnish horror film ever made. It was filmed at Suomi-Filmi's Vironkatu studio in Helsinki and at the Herttoniemi Manor in the Herttoniemi district. The film footage of the film has survived, but the intertitles and original screenplay have lost.

Cast 
 Einar Rinne as Baron Gustaf Drakenhjelm
 Adolf Lindfors as Baron Magnus Drakenhjelm
 Felix Borg as Young Magnus
 Naimi Kari as Lisette Hallström
 Aili Kari as Young Lisette
 Axel Slangus as Sebastian Hallström, the son of Lisette and Magnus
 Joel Rinne as Reverend Richard von Dahlen
 Emil Lindh as Tuomas, Mrs. Hjelm's driver
 Ossi Korhonen as servant
 Jalo Lesche as farmforker of Rautakylä
 Ida Brander as Mrs. Ebba Hjelm née Reutercrona
 Catherine Will as Young Ebba
 Irja Lindström as courtier
 Arna Högdahl as Lotten Ringius, the granddaughter of Ebba
 Bruno Aspelin as King Gustav III of Sweden
 Knut Weckman as Count Reutercrona
 Phyllis Sjöström as Countess Höpkén
 Aune Lindström as courtier

References

External links
 
 RAUTAKYLÄN VANHA PAROONI - Mykkäelokuva (in Finnish)
 Suomalaisen elokuvan festivaali 2001 - kotimainen kauhu (in Finnish)
 Herttoniemi elokuvissa (in Finnish)

1923 films
1923 horror films
Silent horror films
Finnish black-and-white films
Finnish horror films
Finnish films based on plays
Films based on novels